The Moon Riders is a 1920 American silent Western film serial directed by B. Reeves Eason and Theodore Wharton. The serial is considered lost. It ran for 18 episodes.

Cast
 Art Acord as Buck Ravelle, a Ranger
 Charles Newton as Arizona Baldwin
 Mildred Moore as Anna Baldwin, Arizona's Daughter
 George Field as Egbert, Leader of the Moon Riders
 Beatrice Dominguez as Rosa, Housekeeper's Daughter
 Tote Du Crow as Warpee, the Indian Chief
 Albert MacQuarrie as Gant, a crooked attorney

Reception
The Moon Riders is considered to be one of the more successful serials of the silent film era and it established Art Acord as a western star.

Chapter titles
 Over the Precipice 
 The Masked Marauders
 The Red Rage of Jealousy
 Vultures of the Hills
 The Death Trap
 Caves of Mystery
 The Menacing Monster
 The Moon Rider's Bride
 Death's Door
 The Pit of Fire
 The House of Doom
 Unmasked
 His Hour of Torture
 The Flaming Peril
 Rushing Waters
 Clearing Skies

See also
 List of film serials
 List of film serials by studio

References

External links

 

1920 films
1920 Western (genre) films
1920 lost films
American silent serial films
American black-and-white films
Films directed by B. Reeves Eason
Films directed by Theodore Wharton
Lost Western (genre) films
Lost American films
Silent American Western (genre) films
Universal Pictures film serials
1920s American films